Shah Dad Khan is a Pakistani politician born in Lachi District Kohat who had been a member of the Provincial Assembly of Khyber Pakhtunkhwa from August 2018 to January 2023. Shah Dad is the retired major of Pakistan army.

Political career

He was elected to the Provincial Assembly of Khyber Pakhtunkhwa as a candidate of Muttahida Majlis-e-Amal from Constituency PK-81 (Kohat-II) in 2018 Pakistani general election.

References

Living people
Muttahida Majlis-e-Amal MPAs (Khyber Pakhtunkhwa)
Year of birth missing (living people)